Jessica Tan may refer to:
 Jessica Tan (born 1966), Singaporean politician
 Jessica Tan (born 1993), Singaporean badminton player, Commonwealth Games gold medalists in 2022
 Rachel Jessica Tan (born 1985), Australian actress